The first season of Lucha Underground, a lucha libre or professional wrestling show, aired from October 29, 2014 through August 5, 2015 on the El Rey Network in the United States and on later dates on UniMás in Mexico. The debut season of Lucha Underground had 39 episodes in total and presented Lucha libre as a mixture of reality and fiction, adding fantastical elements and movie style backstage clips mixed in with wrestling matches.

Plot overview

The first season on Lucha Underground introduced the viewers to Dario Cueto (Luis Fernandez-Gil), the owner of the "Lucha Underground Temple" in Boyle Heights, Los Angeles. Cueto uses his money and influence to stage fights, promoting violence and often rewarding rule breakers while punishing those that play by the rules. During the season Cueto introduced the Lucha Underground Championship, won by Prince Puma in episode 9 (Aztec Warfare). Later on the Lucha Underground Trios Championship was added, with the first champions being the mismatched team of Angélico, Ivelisse and Son of Havoc. During the season Cueto began rewarding several wrestlers with an "Aztec Medallion", later revealing that they all played a part in the creation of the Gift of the Gods Championship, won by Fénix during the season finale called Ultima Lucha.

Other plot lines included the introduction of the mysterious, supernatural character Mil Muertes ("One Thousand Deaths"; Gilbert Cosme) and his companion Catrina (Karlee Perez) as they first fight against Fénix and later targeted Prince Puma. Catrina also brought in a trio called "the Disciples of Death" (Barrio Negro, El Sinestro de la Muerte and Trece). The season also included a side plot featuring Cueto, his brother Matanza, and Black Lotus (Angela Fong), who tries to kill Cueto and a masked wrestler known as Dragon Azteca who trains Black Lotus during the season. In the final episode of season one, Black Lotus kills Dragon Azteca, causing Cueto to flee the temple with both Black Lotus and Matanza in tow.

Cast and crew

Episodes

Production

All the wrestling matches were taped on location in Boyle Heights, California where a warehouse was converted into the "Lucha Underground Temple" set. The shows themselves were taped over several weekends, usually with two shows being taped per day. Some of the matches were not shown on television but served more as try-outs for wrestlers, often referred to as "dark matches". Throughout the season Matt Striker and Vampiro (Ian Hodgkinson) provided the English language commentary, while Vampiro and Hugo Savinovich taped the Spanish language commentary used when broadcast in Mexico. For the final show, Ultima Lucha, Vampiro wrestled and his place at the commentator desk was taken by Michael Schiavello.

References

External links
 Official website
 MGM webpage for Lucha Underground

2014 American television seasons
2015 American television seasons
Lucha Underground